The Bașeu is a right tributary of the river Prut in Romania. It discharges into the Prut near Ștefănești, on the border with Moldova. It flows through the villages and towns Dămileni, Suharău, Bașeu, Hudești, Havârna, Gârbeni, Tătărășeni, Balinți, Galbeni, Negreni, Știubieni, Săveni, Vlăsinești, Sârbi, Hănești, Moara Jorii, Mihălășeni, Negrești, Păun, Năstase, Ștefănești.

Tributaries
The following rivers are tributaries to the river Bașeu (from source to mouth):
Left: Ursoi, Podriga, Bodeasa, Avrămeni, Sărata, Popoaia
Right: Podul Popii, Ciolac, Pâșcov, Balinți, Glodul Alb, Răchita

References

Rivers of Romania
Rivers of Botoșani County